Dachan Island is an island in Shenzhen, China. Located within Qianhai Bay, it is the second largest island in Shenzhen. Administratively it belongs to Nanshan District.

See also

Nei Lingding Island

References

External links
貿易通電子貿易專網：電子導報 - 川流不息

Geography of Shenzhen
Islands of Guangdong
Islands of China
Populated places in China